Paula is a 1994 memoir by Isabel Allende. She intended to write a straightforward narrative about the darkest experience of her own life. But the book is a tribute to her deceased daughter Paula Frías Allende, who fell into a porphyria-induced coma in 1991 and never recovered.

Plot summary
Isabel Allende wrote Paula while tending to her daughter, Paula Frías Allende, who was in a coma arising from complications of porphyria. Allende started the book as a letter to Paula, explaining what she was missing so she would not be confused when she recovered. The novel includes accounts both of Paula's treatment and of Allende's life, sometimes overlapping with the content of Allende's first novel, The House of the Spirits. Paula died on December 6, 1992. She was survived by her husband, Ernesto Diaz, and other family members.

Characters
Paula Frías Allende
Isabel Allende Llona
Allende family

Themes and issues
In her agonized self-questioning after she finally concedes defeat and surrenders her daughter to death, Isabel strips to her core in the presence of her brother Juan, who has become a priest:
      

In the letter Paula wrote her family on her honeymoon, with the proviso that it was not to be read until after her death, she appears to have foreseen her coma, and her mother's refusal to let her die:

References
Allende, Isabel - Pagina oficial
Metroactive Arts | Isabel Allende
Life and loss after 'Paula' : Books : The Rocky Mountain News
Reading Guide on Paula from harpercollins Publishers
Paula by Isabel Allende
Paula by Isabel Allende | librarything
Paula Summary and Study Guide - Isabel Allende
sabel Allende en clubcultura.com

Autobiographical novels
1994 novels
Novels by Isabel Allende